A kudurru was a type of stone document used as a boundary stone and as a record of land grants to vassals by the Kassites and later dynasties in ancient Babylonia between the 16th and 7th centuries BC. The original kudurru would typically be stored in a temple while the person granted the land would be given a clay copy to use to confirm legal ownership. Kudurrus are often linked to what are usually called "ancient kudurrus", land grant stones from the third millennium (typically Sargonic and Ur III) which serve a similar purpose though the word kudurru did not emerge until the 2nd millennium (Middle Babylonian in fact).

Background
The objects are traditionally called kudurru which is Akkadian for "frontier" or "boundary". because early epigraphers frequently found that word in the text and assumed they were placed in agricultural setting, not the temples they actually were. While there is consensus on the main group of kudurru there are other "debatable kudurru for which opinion is divided, such as those on clay nails. Kudurru typically referred to themselves as "narû"  which is Akkadian for stone or stele (occasionally as kudurru, asumittu, or abnu). About one third of the 160 known kudurru were found in temples at Susa where they were taken when the Elamites conquered Mesopotamia. Half of those excavated in Babylonia were also found in temples. They range in height from 10cm to 1 meter and the inscriptions on them ranged from 39 to 390 lines. Examples are in the Louvre, the British Museum, and the National Museum of Iraq. One kudurru, of Marduk-nadin-ahhe (1095–1078 BC) of the Second Dynasty of Isin is found in the Warwick Museum. Another kudduru of that ruler, long and essentially complete,  was found near Ctesiphon and is held in the Baghdad Museum. They are examples of how kudurru usage continued for several centuries after the end of the Kassite Dynasty. The last known kudurru was of the Babylonian ruler Ashur-nadin-shumi (700–694 BC).

Content

While most kudurru record land grants some serve other purposes. Two kudurrus of Nebuchadnezzar I (1121–1100 BC) records his victory over the Elamites and his recovery of the cult statue of Marduk, the city god of Babylon, captured years earlier. Another example, from the reign of Nabu-apla-iddina (886–853 BC) commemorates the recovery of the Sippar city-god Shamash, lost circa 1100 BC when the Suteans overran several cult centers in Babylonia. This replaced a sun disk erected by the ruler Simbar-shipak (1021–1004 BC) as a stand in. Other kudurru record legal cases, usually when loss of life is involved, making it the domain of the ruler. Finally, some kudurru record gifts of prebends (income from land for temples or priests) or royal relief from taxes or labor for individuals.

Kudurru have a standard format with some features being optional. They contain:

A description of the kudurru's intent, granting land, etc. There may be a relief illustrating this, showing the king, the grantee, or the defendant as appropriate.
A call upon the gods to recognize and endorse the kudurru and to curse anyone who violates the intent or damages the stone. There may be symbols of the relevant gods on the stele to strengthen this call. These symbols have been the cause of much speculation over the years, some of it chronological.

Examples of kudurrus
Enlil-bānī land grant kudurru
Nazimaruttaš kudurru stone 
Kudurru of Kaštiliašu 
Land grant to Ḫunnubat-Nanaya kudurru
Land grant to Marduk-apla-iddina I by Meli-Shipak II
Estate of Takil-ana-ilīšu kudurru
Land grant to Ḫasardu kudurru
Land grant to Marduk-zākir-šumi kudurru
Land grant to Munnabittu kudurru
Kudurru of Gula
Kudurru for Šitti-Marduk
Eanna-shum-iddina kudurru
Marduk-nadin-ahhe kudurru
Marduk-zakir-šumi I kudurru
Marduk-apal-iddina II kudurru

See also
 Sun God Tablet
 Tablet of Shamash
 Stele of Meli-Šipak
 Kurgan stelae
 Runestone

References

Further reading
Al-Adhami, K. "A New Kudurru of Maroduk-nadin-ahhe." Sumer 38 (1982): 121-33
J. A. Brinkman, "A Political History of Post-Kassite Babylonia", AnOr 43 (Rome: Pontifical Biblical Institute, 1968), 348
Brinkman, J. A. and Dalley, Stephanie. "A Royal Kudurru from the Reign of Aššur-nādin-šumi", ZAVA, vol. 78, no. 1, 1988, pp. 76-98
Brinkman, M.E. and Brinkman, J.A.. "A Tenth-Century Kudurru Fragment" , vol. 62, no. 1, 1972, pp. 91-98
Charpin, D., "Chroniques bibliographiques, 2: La Commemoration d'actes juridiques: Apropos des kudurrus babyloniens.", Revue d'assyriologie 96: 169-91. 2002 (published November 2004) (in french)
Frame, Grant. "A Kudurru Fragment from the Reign of Adad-apla-iddina." Altorientalische Forschungen 13.1-2 (1986): 206-211
 W. J. Hinke, "Selected Babylonian Kudurru Inscriptions", (Semitic Study Series, edited by R. J. H. Gottheil and Morris Jastrow, jun., No. XIV.) Leiden: late E. J. Brill, 1911
Hurowitz, Victor (Avigdor). "Some Literary Observations on the Šitti-Marduk Kudurru (BBSt. 6)" , vol. 82, no. 1, 1992, pp. 39-59
 L.W. King, "Babylonian Boundary Stones and Memorial Tablets in the British Museum (BBSt)" (London: Trustees of the British Museum, 1912)
Reade, J. E. 1987. "Babylonian Boundary-Stones and Comparable Monuments in the British Museum."  Annual Review of the Royal Inscriptions of Mesopotamia Project 5: 47-51
 Ursula Seidl, "Die babylonischen Kudurru-Reliefs: Symbole mesopotamischer Gottheiten", Vandenhoeck & Ruprecht (December 31, 1988) (in german)
Steinkeller, Piotr. "“Ancient Kudurru” Inscriptions." Ed. AR George, Cuneiform Royal Inscriptions and Related Texts in the Schøyen Collection, The publication of Cornell University Studies in Assyriology and Sumerology 17 (2011): 211-220
Zimmermann, Lynn-Salammbô. "Wooden Wax-Covered Writing Boards as Vorlage for kudurru Inscriptions in the Middle Babylonian Period" Journal of Ancient Near Eastern History, 2022

External links

Kudurru at British Museum BM 102485
Kudurru at British Museum BM 90841
Kudurrus at Seattle Art Museum

Kassites
Archaeology of Iraq
 
Stone sculptures
Sculpture of the Ancient Near East